Mogli pericolose ("Dangerous wives") is a 1958 Italian comedy film written and directed by Luigi Comencini.

Cast
 Sylva Koscina: Tosca, Pirro's wife
 Dorian Gray: Ornella, Bruno's wife
 Renato Salvatori: Dr. Federico Carpi
 Nino Taranto: Pirro
 Franco Fabrizi: Bruno
 Mario Carotenuto: Benito "Benny" Bertuetti
 Giorgia Moll: Claudina Carpi
 Pupella Maggio: Aurelia "Lolita" Bertuetti
 Bruno Carotenuto: Tato
 Maria-Pia Casilio: Elisa
 Rosalba Neri: Angelina
 Pina Gallini: Mrs. Zamparini
 Pina Renzi: Ornella's mother
 Nando Bruno: Taxi driver
 Yvette Masson: Corinne
 Vittoria Crispo: Caterina
 Ciccio Barbi

References

External links
 

1958 comedy films
Italian comedy films
Films directed by Luigi Comencini
1950s Italian-language films
1950s Italian films